Ali Ghandour (28 May 1931 – 29 August 2020) was a Lebanese-Jordanian businessman, the president of ARAM Trading and Technology. He was a native of Lebanon and a Jordanian citizen. Ghandour died on 29 August 29 2020.

Education and early life
Ghandour was born on 28 May 1931, in Beirut, Lebanon where he spent most of his youth, he was admitted to IC, a private co-educational preparatory school to the American University of Beirut which he graduated from later with Aerospace engineering degree. He also went for further education at New York University - United States.
Gandour went back to Lebanon in 1954 and joined the Lebanese Civil Aviation Authority as an engineer and Head of aviation Safety.

Ghandour's political tendencies led him to join the Syrian Social Nationalist Party (SSNP) whose members were chased after by the Lebanese government due to a failed coup which the party attempted in 1961. Despite the fact that Ghandour was in Paris on a training course during the coup, he was wanted by the Lebanese government and considered a fugitive. Thus, Gandour took refuge at Paris then Côte d'Ivoire which he left later to Kuwait.

Ghandour's refuge in Kuwait was accepted by the Kuwaiti authorities as long as no conviction was issued by the Lebanese government for his arrest. Ghandour remained and worked for the Directorate General of Civil Aviation in Kuwait not long before a death sentence in absentia was issued by Lebanon which forced him to leave immediately to Jordan.

Jordan
Ghandour and colleagues from the (SSNP) went to meet up with King Hussein to thank him for Jordan's acceptance of refuge. The meeting was Ghandour's life turning point when King Hussein asked him about his future plans to which Ghandour's intentions were to travel back to West Africa. King Hussein did not recommend Ghandour's plans, instead he offered him to remain in Jordan in order to establish a new national airline to which Ghandour accepted.

Gandour presented the Feasibility study to King Hussein which he liked and gave orders to commence the project backed up by a Royal decree in 1963 . A week later, a DCC plane was leased from Lebanese International Airways and was scheduled to fly to Jerusalem and Beirut. Two more Dart Heralds of Royal Jordanian Air Force were provided by King Hussein to convert into civilian planes for usage in the newly established airline.

Gandour's recommendation to name the new airline Royal Jordanian was approved by King Hussein, the name was also extended to ALIA after the king's eldest daughter Princess Alia. (It is a common misconception that the airline was named after the King's third wife, Queen Alia.)

A devoted supporter of the American University of Beirut, Ghandour served as trustee (1979–2008) and was named trustee emeritus in 2008.

Career and positions held
 Founder and Chairman of Arab Wings
 Founder and chairman of Royal Jordanian
 Director of Jet Airways
 Member of Advisory Board at MerchantBridge & Co
 Founder and Board Member of Aramex
 Board Member of Nas Air
 Board of Trustees of the American University of Beirut
 Co-chairman of Aviation Pioneers
 Advisor to King Hussein on civil aviation, civil air transport and tourism
 Member of Board at ARAM International Investments
 Member of Board at Jordan Tourism Resorts Company
 Founder of Arab Air Cargo
 Founder of Royal Jordanian Air Academy
 Member of Board at Reaching Hearts for Kids
 Board of Trustees of the Royal Society of Fine Arts
 Board of Trustees of the Royal Endowment for Culture and Education
 Member of Arab Thought Forum
 Member of Saadeh Cultural Foundation

Awards and decorations
 Grand Cordon of the Order of Al Nahda of Jordan
 Grand Decoration of Honour in Silver with Sash for Services to the Republic of Austria (3rd Cl., 1980)
 Commandeur d'Ordre National du Merite de la Legion of Honour of France
 National Order of the Cedar, Lebanon

See also
 Ahmed Ghandour
 Fadi Ghandour

References

1931 births
2020 deaths
Businesspeople from Beirut
Jordanian businesspeople
Lebanese emigrants to Jordan
Jordanian people of Lebanese descent
American University of Beirut alumni
New York University alumni
Royal Jordanian people
Jet Airways people
Academic staff of the American University of Beirut
Center for Contemporary Arab Studies faculty

Recipients of the Grand Decoration with Sash for Services to the Republic of Austria
Commandeurs of the Légion d'honneur
Recipients of the National Order of the Cedar